Gregory Scott Tony (born 1978) is an American law enforcement officer and serving since 2019 as the 17th Sheriff of Broward County, Florida.  

Tony was initially appointed sheriff in 2019 by Florida governor Ron DeSantis, to fill a vacancy.  In November 2020, Tony won election to the office of sheriff, which he had previously held by appointment.

Early life and education
Tony was born and raised in Philadelphia, Pennsylvania, the youngest of five children of Gloria Tony and William Scott. He attended Olney High School in Philadelphia, graduating in 1997.

Tony moved to Tallahassee, Florida, and attended Tallahassee Community College. He then  attended Florida State University in Tallahassee, where he played football under Bobby Bowden. He graduated with a bachelor's degree in criminology in 2002. He later obtained a master's degree in criminal justice from Nova Southeastern University in Fort Lauderdale, Florida.

Early career (2005-18)

He was first employed as a police officer by the suburban Coral Springs Police Department from 2005, when he was 26 years old, to 2016, ultimately becoming a sergeant.  Tony's resume indicates that for years he has also served as an adjunct professor. He lived in Boca Raton, Florida. Tony resigned from the Coral Springs Police Department on September 19, 2016, amid tensions with his superiors regarding his sick leave usage. 

From shortly thereafter in 2016 through 2017, for over a year, Tony worked as Director of Community Development at North American Rescue, a South Carolina company that sold bleeding-control kits and stations. A company Tony founded, Blue Spear Solutions, that is now run by Tony's wife, has sold North American Rescue's products since 2015.  The Blue Spear Solutions website said it was a “proud partner” of North American Rescue, and displayed North American Rescue products. In a June 2019 financial disclosure statement, Tony said he had a negative net worth, and did not list any income from Blue Spear Solutions. Between July and September 2019, as Tony was Sheriff of Broward County, the Broward Sheriff's Office purchased over half a million dollars of North American Rescue's bleeding-control stations.

Sheriff of Broward County (2019–present)

Appointment
While running for Governor of Florida, Ron DeSantis made a campaign promise to replace Broward Sheriff Scott Israel. Press reported that Tony was one of three possibilities for the position, along with former sheriff Al Lamberti and county judge John Fry.

According to the Sun Sentinel, newly elected governor DeSantis's vetting of Tony was "rushed". The governor's office requested that a background check be performed on Tony one day before DeSantis appointed Tony to the position.

On January 11, 2019, days after Florida governor DeSantis took office, DeSantis suspended the prior sheriff for allegedly mishandling the Fort Lauderdale airport shooting and the  Stoneman Douglas High School shooting. DeSantis at the same time appointed Tony the Sheriff of Broward County, Florida. DeSantis appointed Tony largely on the recommendation of a parent of a Stoneman Douglas High School shooting victim, who had met and worked out with Tony in a gym. The Miami Herald called Tony "an unlikely choice."

Union vote of no confidence, and call for Tony's removal
In April 2020, four days after a 39-year-old Broward Sheriff's Office deputy died from COVID-19 during the COVID-19 pandemic in Florida, and after 20 other deputies tested positive for the virus, President Jeff Bell of the Broward Sheriff’s Office Deputies Association – a 1,400-member branch of the International Union of Police Associations – criticized Tony over the lack of personal protective equipment for the officers, and Tony's failure to respond to their memos about the situation. Tony said Bell’s actions were "dishonorable."  Three days later, Tony suspended the union president without pay, and placed him under administrative investigation.  Tony then terminated the union president in January 2022. 

The union announced a vote of no-confidence by its officers in Tony.  A total of 88% of 786 voting road deputies and sergeants voted "no confidence" in Tony.

On June 3, 2020, the union wrote governor DeSantis to formally request that Tony be removed. The governor did not take any action.

Discovery of 1993 killing by Tony 
On May 3, 1993, when he was 14 years old and living in Philadelphia, Tony killed an 18-year-old male neighbor with a .32 caliber revolver. Tony shot his neighbor six times, including twice in the back of his head and twice in his back. 

He surrendered to police the next day. Tony was arrested for murder and weapons offenses at 10:40 AM, fingerprinted, arraigned, incarcerated in a juvenile detention center maximum security unit, initially charged and ordered to stand trial as an adult for murder and several weapons offenses, and held without bail pending a preliminary hearing. One week later, bail was set at $15,000. The case was then transferred to juvenile court. There, he was found not guilty after he maintained that the shooting was in self-defense; the family of the deceased disputed that assertion, witnesses who said they had seen the killing and that the deceased had not been armed nor was it a case of self defense were not called. The court records relating to the killing are sealed. However, the Philadelphia police homicide report outlining key events and witness statements in the case has been published publicly. 

Tony did not disclose the killing when he applied for law enforcement jobs. He later declined to be interviewed by FDLE agents reviewing the matter.

In his application to the Coral Springs Police Department, Tony answered "no" to "Have you ever been arrested, charged, received a notice or summons to appear for any criminal violation?" Years later, Tony asserted that he was not "technically" charged with a crime.  When asked about the shooting, Tony denied he had been arrested, asserting that he simply went to the police station to provide a statement and was allowed to leave with his father. The FDLE said that he was in fact charged with murder, and that Tony lied.

In Tony's Coral Springs Police Department application process he also answered "no" to other questions that – had he answered them truthfully – would have revealed that he had once killed a man.

DeSantis did not know about Tony's killing prior to appointing Tony, and it did not come up in a background check of Tony during vetting.  When DeSantis found out about Tony's killing in May 2020, he distanced himself from Tony, but said that the shooting had not come up in the background check because it was self-defense and would not have made a difference.  DeSantis added that he would leave the matter for Broward voters to decide.

Investigations of Tony

2020
On January 7, 2020, Tony filled out a Florida Department of Law Enforcement (FDLE) Affidavit of Applicant form. On this official document, Tony checked off "no" to the question of ever having a criminal record sealed or expunged. Tony later asserted that since he did not have a criminal record, he had filled out the form correctly. However, on May 8, 2020, the FDLE announced the matter had been upgraded from an inquiry to an FDLE investigation.

On May 19, 2020, it was discovered that in 2003, Tony had applied to the Tallahassee Police Department, but had  been rejected for employment, after he admitted that he had used the psychedelic drug LSD. In rejecting Tony, the department pointed to its “zero tolerance for felony drug use.” 

Tony then applied to the Coral Springs Police Department in 2005, at which time Tony omitted mentioning his drug use on his application, and denied using drugs such as LSD. Tony also omitted the fact that he had applied to — and been rejected by — the Tallahassee Police Department, even though he listed other agencies to which he had previously applied. He was hired by the Coral Springs Police Department. The former Coral Springs Police Chief from the time Tony was hired later said that the Coral Springs Police Department would certainly not have hired Tony, if it had been aware that Tony had used LSD.

2022
In January 2022, a 20-page FDLE report said that Tony had lied on multiple police applications. The report said that Tony failed to disclose that he had fatally shot a teenager, and been arrested for the killing. The police applications that he had completed had required Tony to disclose all times he had been arrested, regardless of the court decision; however, the FDLE said that Tony could not be charged criminally for his failure to report the killing and his arrest, because the relevant statute of limitations had expired. According to the report, Tony also lied when he applied to the Coral Springs Police Department, when he answered "no" when he was asked whether he had ever been in a fight in which a weapon was used. Tony also answered "no" when he was asked on the application whether he had ever injured or caused the death of another person.  State investigators found, however, that Tony had in fact been arrested and charged with murder and with several weapons offenses, and further that he had lied on his applications about his traffic violations, his driver license suspension, his drug use, and a charge against him for passing a bad check. Tony declined to be interviewed for the report. The FDLE referred its report to the Florida Ethics Commission for its consideration. The South Florida Sun-Sentinel editorial board wrote: "The plain truth: Tony’s lies make him unfit for sheriff’s badge."

In June 2022, an FDLE investigation found that Tony had in February 2019 provided false information on an application for a driver's license. The FDLE recommended that Tony be charged with the felony of "false affidavit perjury." That is one count, of a total of eight, leveled against Tony for “Unlawful Acts in Relation to Driver License.”

A three-member Florida Criminal Justice Standards & Training Commission panel recommended that a disciplinary process be initiated, and that Tony be barred from being a law enforcement officer in Florida. In July 2022, Tony filed a request for an administrative hearing with the Criminal Justice Standards Commission; that hearing would be before an administrative law judge.

In early September 2022, the Florida Commission on Ethics, at a hearing arising from a referral by the Florida Department of Law Enforcement, opined that probable cause existed supporting the belief that when Tony applied for positions with the Coral Springs Police Department and the Broward Sheriff’s Office, he misused his public position as he submitted false information or failed to submit information. The Commission also found probable cause that Tony submitted false information or failed to disclose information about his past drug use, and about his having been arrested for homicide, when he was appointed to his current sheriff position. The Commission in addition found that Tony had submitted false information on a number of Florida driver's license renewals, falsely claiming that his driving privileges had never been revoked, suspended, or denied. Commissioner Michelle Anchors said: "I think we all find this respondent’s conduct despicable. I don’t want to be an apologist for a person who has lied continuously and repeatedly." Commission member Willie Meggs, who concluded that Tony had committed perjury, said: "It boggles my mind."

Later in September 2022, as a result of the ethics commission's statement, Tony was added by Broward state prosecutors to its list of law enforcement officials who could be perceived as having credibility issues that might render their testimony in a trial less than credible.

In December 2022, the Florida Commission on Ethics, at a hearing arising from a citizen complaint—separate from its  September 2022 hearing on Tony arising from a referral by the Florida Department of Law Enforcement—"found probable cause to believe ... Tony misused his public position when he provided false information or did not disclose information during the appointment process for his service as Broward County Sheriff." The Commission focused at this second hearing on a notarized form that Tony had submitted to the Florida Department of Law Enforcement, and when he had applied to renew his driver’s license. The research director at government watchdog Integrity Florida, a nonpartisan organization, said that he viewed the charges as serious, and that: "It’s more perplexing why the governor hasn’t taken action."

2020 election 
Tony first ran against Scott Israel (whom he defeated with 37% of the vote, to 35% for Israel) and several lesser-known candidates in the August 2020 Broward County Democratic primary election. As of May, Tony had raised $1.1 million, to $0.1 million raised by Israel. In the November general election, Tony then won against Republican H. Wayne Clark and independent Charles "Chuck" Whatley, with 63% of the vote in the overwhelmingly Democratic county.

References

External links 
Gregory Tony 2020 campaign site

1978 births
Date of birth missing (living people)
Living people
Florida sheriffs
People acquitted of murder
People from Boca Raton, Florida
People from Coral Springs, Florida
People from Philadelphia
People from Tallahassee, Florida
African-American people in Florida politics
African-American police officers
Florida Democrats
Florida State Seminoles football players
Nova Southeastern University alumni
Tallahassee Community College alumni
21st-century African-American people
20th-century African-American people